Mitrovice may refer to:

 Mitrovicë, a town in Kosovo
 Nové Mitrovice, a village in the Czech Republic
 Mitrovice, a village in Mezno, Benešov District, Czech Republic

See also
 Mitrovica (disambiguation)